Events from the year 1176 in Ireland.

Events
 John de Courcy (also John de Courci) (d. 1219), an Anglo-Norman knight arrives in Ireland.

Births

Deaths
Richard de Clare, 2nd Earl of Pembroke (Strongbow), who led the Norman invasion of Ireland (born 1130).
Maurice FitzGerald, Lord of Lanstephan, soldier (b. c.1105)

References